Gert Johannes Gerwel  (18 January 1946 – 28 November 2012) was a South African academic and anti-apartheid activist. He served as Director-General of the Presidency when Nelson Mandela was in office. In 1999 Gerwel was instrumental in brokering the deal under which Lockerbie bombing suspects were extradited to Scotland.  Following Mandela's presidency, Gerwel chaired the Nelson Mandela Foundation and the Mandela Rhodes Foundation, and also took up a number of academic and business positions until his death in November 2012.

Teaching career
Gerwel matriculated from Paterson High School in Port Elizabeth, and in 1967 earned a Bachelor of Arts degree from the University of the Western Cape (UWC). He then lectured at the Hewat Teachers' Training College in Crawford, Cape Town for a short time before receiving a scholarship, in 1971, to study at the Vrije Universiteit Brussel (VUB). On his return to South Africa, Gerwel first taught at Grassy Park High School and then returned to UWC as a lecturer.

Legacy 
In 2015 Vanguard Drive, a major road running from Cape Town's southern suburbs to the Cape Flats (the M7 road), was renamed in Jakes Gerwel's honour.

Jakes Gerwel Technical School in Bonnievale, Western Cape is named in after him.

References

Anti-apartheid activists
1946 births
2012 deaths